Mariëlle van Scheppingen (born 2 May 1973) is a road cyclist from the Netherlands. She represented her nation at the 2000 UCI Road World Championships. She married the speed skater Gianni Romme in 2001.

References

External links
 profile at dewielersite.com

1973 births
Living people
Dutch female cyclists
Place of birth missing (living people)
People from Uithoorn
UCI Road World Championships cyclists for the Netherlands
Cyclists from North Holland